The 50th Expeditionary Signal Battalion is a United States Army unit which is part of the 35th Signal Brigade located at Fort Bragg, North Carolina. The 
Brigade's mission is to provide worldwide contingency, force projection, forced-entry signal support to  the XVIII Airborne Corps for power-projection operations during war and operations other than war.

In 2018, 50th Expeditionary Signal Battalion-Enhanced  (50th ESB-E), 35th Theater Tactical Signal Brigade is serving as the ESB-E pilot unit. 50th ESB-E supports the XVIII Airborne Corps. Potentially this ESB-E will provide capabilities that are scalable, from small units  (forcible-entry alongside paratrooper jumps), to larger, mature operations, as an expeditionary force keeps growing on the ground.

History
The 50th has been supporting the needs of the Army for 114 years, longer than any other active-duty signal unit. With missions ranging from underwater cabling to disaster relief home and abroad to convoy security, to peacekeeping, the 50th Signal Battalion has seen it all.

The unit has served with distinction in the Philippines, Japan, Iceland, France, Germany, Iraq, Afghanistan, Liberia, Somalia, Dominican Republic, Grenada, Panama, Jamaica, and Honduras. The 50th stormed the beaches at Normandy and led from the front in Desert Storm. It was the first and only Airborne Signal Battalion when it joined the XVIII Airborne Corps in the 1950s, though the airborne tab was dropped as a part of force modularity in 2006.

References

050